The John Hunter House in Jessamine County, Kentucky, near Logana, Kentucky, was built in 1792.  It has also been known as the Old County Poor Farm.  It was listed on the National Register of Historic Places in 1985.

It was built for one of the first two European-descent settlers in the county, John Jacob Hunter.  The house was used for a time as a county poor farm during the late 1800s and early 1900s.

References

Houses on the National Register of Historic Places in Kentucky
Federal architecture in Kentucky
Houses completed in 1792
National Register of Historic Places in Jessamine County, Kentucky
Poor farms
County government buildings in Kentucky
Farms on the National Register of Historic Places in Kentucky
1792 establishments in Kentucky
Poverty in the United States